Graphium wallacei is a butterfly found in New Guinea and the Moluccas that belongs to the swallowtail family.

Subspecies
G. w. wallacei (Aru Islands, western Irian, New Guinea)
G. w. rubrosignatus (Rothschild, 1895) (Halmahera, Bachan, Obi Islands)

Taxonomy
Graphium wallacei belongs to the wallacei species group. This clade has four members:
Graphium wallacei (Hewitson, 1858)
Graphium hicetaon (Mathew, 1886)
Graphium browni (Godman & Salvin, 1879)
Graphium sandawanum Yamamoto, 1977

References

Jordan, K., 1908-1910. Papilionidae, Papilio bis Armandia. in Seitz: Großschmetterlinge der Erde. Die Indo-Australische Tagfalter. IX:11-109,112; Pls.1-49. pdf

External links
Papua insects

wallacei
Butterflies of Indonesia
Lepidoptera of New Guinea
Butterflies described in 1858